Josef Kaufman (born 27 March 1984) is a Czech former professional footballer who played as a defender.

Career
Kaufman formerly played in the Gambrinus Liga for FK Teplice before going on loan to Viking FK in 2008.
At the beginning of the year 2009 towards the end of the loan in Viking, he decided not to extend his contract with Viking, and signed with Czech league champions Slavia Prague.

References

External links 
 
 Zbrojovka Profile

1984 births
Living people
Sportspeople from Pardubice
Czech footballers
Association football defenders
Czech Republic youth international footballers
Czech Republic under-21 international footballers
Czech First League players
Eliteserien players
Slovak Super Liga players
FK Teplice players
Viking FK players
SK Slavia Prague players
FC Spartak Trnava players
FC Zbrojovka Brno players
Czech expatriate footballers
Czech expatriate sportspeople in Norway
Expatriate footballers in Norway
Czech expatriate sportspeople in Slovakia
Expatriate footballers in Slovakia
Czech expatriate sportspeople in Austria
Expatriate footballers in Austria